Earl James Browne (March 5, 1911 – January 12, 1993) was an American professional baseball player and manager. He was born in Louisville, Kentucky, and attended Manual High School in that city.

Browne spent one full season and parts of three others in Major League Baseball between 1935 and 1938, toiling for the Pittsburgh Pirates and Philadelphia Phillies. During his full season, spent with the 1937 Phillies, Browne appeared in 102 games, with 97 hits in 322 at bats for a .294 batting average, including six home runs and 52 runs batted in. Overall, he batted .284 with six homers and 69 RBI in 143 MLB games.

Browne also had a 22-year career in minor league baseball as a southpaw pitcher, outfielder and first baseman. He batted .304 in 2,167 minor league games, with 183 home runs and 1,301 RBI, and twice batted over .400 as a playing manager in the Class D KITTY League (1946–1947) as skipper of the Owensboro Oilers, a Boston Braves farm club. He compiled a 51–42 won/lost mark in six years as a minor league pitcher.

He died in Whittier, California, at the age of 81.

References

External links
Career statistics, from Baseball Reference

1911 births
1993 deaths
Asheville Tourists players
Atlanta Crackers players
Baseball players from Louisville, Kentucky
Chattanooga Lookouts players
Columbus Red Birds players
Dayton Aviators players
Hartford Chiefs players
Huntington Boosters players
Knoxville Smokies players
Little Rock Travelers players
Louisville Colonels (minor league) players
Major League Baseball first basemen
Major League Baseball outfielders
Minneapolis Millers (baseball) players
Mobile Marines players
New Orleans Pelicans (baseball) players
Owensboro Oilers players
Philadelphia Phillies players
Pittsburgh Pirates players